Look! It's El Perro del Mar! is the first album by El Perro del Mar. It was released by Hybris Records in 2005. The album is a compilation of singles and EPs recorded between January 2004 and February 2005. The Look! album was revised into Sarah's following self-titled album, which was released to wider audiences across the world than this album (which was released in Sweden only).

Track listing

 "Candy" - 3:24
 "Sad" - 2:42
 "Party" - 3:13
 "Dog" - 3:02
 "Coming Down the Hill" - 2:34
 "People" - 3:20
 "Shake It Off" - 3:34
 "This Loneliness" - 4:44
 "It's All Good" - 3:39
 "I Can't Talk About It" - 2:57
 "Here Comes That Feeling" - 3:15

2005 debut albums
El Perro del Mar albums